Chen Tao (真道, or "True Way") was a UFO religion that originated in Taiwan. It was founded by Hon-Ming Chen (陳恆明 born 1955), who first associated it with UFOs and later had the group misrepresented as a New Age UFO cult. Chen was a former professor who claimed to be an atheist until he joined a religious cultivation group that dated back for two generations to the original female founder, Teacher Yu-Hsia Chen. But he broke with the group, headed by the third-generation teacher, in 1993 and created, with another fellow-cultivator, Tao-hung Ma, their own groups. It was later, when he broke with Ma and decided to move to the US, that new elements, such as the pseudo-scientific information of cosmology and flying saucers, as well as Christian motifs of the prophecy of the end and the great tribulation, etc., were introduced into the group.

In Taiwan, the group was originally officially registered as the Chinese Soul Light Research Association. When the group moved to the United States from Asia, it was registered in the US as God's Salvation Church and first relocated to San Dimas, California. Adherents moved to Garland, Texas, in 1997.

Beliefs 

This New Religious Movement was a mix of Buddhism, Taoism, and UFOlogy. It emphasized transmigration of souls (with three souls per person) and placed great emphasis on spiritual energy. Adherents also believed in "outside souls," who basically acted as bad influences, or even as demons, in the human world.

Chen believed that Earth went through five tribulations going back to the age of the dinosaurs. Each of these tribulations was survived by beings living in North America who were rescued by God in a flying saucer. He believed the solar system is 4.5 trillion years old, or roughly 300 times the age science gives for the Universe. He believed that the solar system was created by a nuclear war.

Failed prophecy

The group is best known for a highly publicized, and failed, millennial prophecy. Shortly after moving to Garland in August 1997, Chen predicted that at 12:01 a.m. on March 31, 1998, God would be seen on a single television channel all across North America. Whether or not the person had cable service was irrelevant to God's appearance on that channel.

The group reportedly moved to Garland because the name sounded like "God Land." At the time the group had roughly 160 members, 40 of which were children. Members purchased more than 20 homes in an upper-middle-class south Garland neighborhood. Like their neighbors, these followers were white-collar professionals, some of whom were reportedly wealthy. "They dressed in white, wore cowboy hats and drove luxury cars," according to The Dallas Morning News. "They reportedly believed that two young boys in their group were the reincarnations of Jesus and Buddha. They told reporters they had come to Garland to watch God come to Earth and take human form at 10 a.m. on March 31, 1998, at the home of Mr. Chen, a former college professor."

The Garland Police Department, understanding the potential gravity of the situation, coordinated resources, including Southern Methodist University religious studies professor Lonnie Kliever, and were on stand-by when the international media began arriving in what had previously been an upper-middle-class section of the Dallas suburb. "Its presence unsettled many Garland residents," wrote Adam Szubin in a law enforcement case study. "They did not understand the group's different style of dress and behavior, and many feared violence.  Throughout the group's stay, the [police] department maintained contact with community members and informed them of investigation developments and contingency plans for the community's well being."

When the predicted appearance did not occur, the group became confused. "The Chen Tao leader announced that he obviously had misunderstood God's plans, and members quietly returned to their homes," wrote Szubin. Chen offered to be stoned or crucified for the event, but no one took him up on this offer. He had earlier made a false prediction of finding a "Jesus of the West," who would look like Abraham Lincoln.

Aftermath 

Unlike other millennial religious groups, such as Millerites, Chen Tao seems to have effectively fallen apart after its leader's prophecies went unfulfilled. Immediately after the failed prediction, some of the members had to return to Taiwan owing to visa problems; in total, roughly two-thirds abandoned the group. Later the remaining members moved to Lockport, New York. They continued to wear cowboy hats but began stating that a war between China and Taiwan would lead to a nuclear holocaust that would result in much death, but also God's arrival in a "God plane" to save the members. They originally stated that this would occur in 1999, but later revised the date.

Whether Chen Tao still exists is uncertain. The group entered a sharp decline after the failed prophecies, and virtually nothing was heard of it after 2001. The current whereabouts of Hon-Ming Chen are unknown.

See also
Doomsday cult
List of UFO religions

References

External links
 Chen Tao at RM
 Loyola essay on them
 CESNUR article
 Online Journal Article by Charles Houston Prather

Apocalyptic groups
East Asian religions
Religious syncretism in Asia
UFO religions
Taoist schools
Religious organizations based in Taiwan
Religious organizations established in 1955